Estádio Vail Chaves, is a multi-purpose stadium in Mogi-Mirim, São Paulo, Brazil. It is currently used mostly for football matches. The stadium has a capacity of 19,900 people.

Estádio Vail chaves is owned by Mogi Mirim Esporte Clube.

History
In 1991, the works on the stadium were completed. It was named Estádio Wilson Fernandes de Barros, after a Mogi Mirim Esporte Clube's president, and city's mayor. The inaugural match was played on July 7 of that year, when Mogi Mirim beat Palmeiras 4–2. The first goal of the stadium was scored by Mogi Mirim's Demetrius.

References
Enciclopédia do Futebol Brasileiro, Volume 2 - Lance, Rio de Janeiro: Aretê Editorial S/A, 2001.

External links
Templos do Futebol

Football venues in São Paulo (state)
Multi-purpose stadiums in Brazil